Mikael Birkkjær (born 14 September 1958) is a Danish actor.

Raised in Copenhagen, Birkkjær trained at Skuespillerskolen at Odense Teater in 1985. He is best known internationally for his roles as Phillip Christensen in the Danish TV political drama Borgen, and Inspector Ulrik Strange in the 2009 TV series Forbrydelsen.

Personal life
Birkkjær was previously married to actress Tammi Øst with whom he has two children, Rasmus and Andrea;.

Film 
 Lad de små børn... (2004) (marketed as Aftermath in English speaking countries)
 Oh Happy Day (2004)
 Springet (2005)
 The Escape (2009)
 Room 304 (2011)
 All Inclusive (2014)
 What We Become (2016)

TV Series 
 Een gang strømer... (1987)
 Krøniken (2005)
 Sommer (2008)
 Forbrydelsen (2009) (marketed as The Killing in English speaking countries)
 Borgen (2010/2011/2022)
 The Bridge (2018)

TV films 
En farlig mand (1987)
Begær, Lighed og Broderskab (1990)
Boksning (1988)

References

External links

1958 births
Living people
Danish male television  actors
Danish male film actors
Danish male stage actors
20th-century Danish male actors
21st-century Danish male actors
Male actors from Copenhagen